Cozia may refer to several places in Romania:

Cozia Monastery, Vâlcea County
Cozia Mountains, Vâlcea County
Cozia National Park, Vâlcea County
 Cozia, a village in Cornereva Commune, Caraș-Severin County
 Cozia, a village in Cârjiți Commune, Hunedoara County
 Cozia, a village in Costuleni Commune, Iași County
 Cozia, a village in Pristol Commune, Mehedinți County
 Cozia (river), a tributary of the Bohotin in Iași County